Hugh Turner may refer to:

 Hugh Turner (footballer, born 1904) (1904–?), English Huddersfield Town goalkeeper football player
 Hugh Turner (footballer, born 1917) (1917–1992), English Darlington full back football player
 Hugh Turner (theologian) (1907–1995), academic and priest
 Hugh Thackeray Turner (1853–1937), English architect

See also
 Turner (surname)